The Overland Telegraph is a 1929 American silent Western film directed by John Waters and written by Harry Sinclair Drago, George C. Hull and Edward J. Meagher. The film stars Tim McCoy, Dorothy Janis, Frank Rice, Lawford Davidson, Clarence Geldart and Chief John Big Tree. The film was released on March 2, 1929, by Metro-Goldwyn-Mayer.

Cast 
 Tim McCoy as Captain Allen
 Dorothy Janis as Dorothy 
 Frank Rice as Easy
 Lawford Davidson as Briggs
 Clarence Geldart as Major Hammond 
 Chief John Big Tree as Medicine Man

Preservation
 The film was preserved by MGM and a copy donated for preservation to George Eastman House.

References

External links 
 

1929 films
1929 Western (genre) films
American Civil War films
American black-and-white films
1920s English-language films
Films directed by John Waters (director born 1893)
Metro-Goldwyn-Mayer films
Silent American Western (genre) films
1920s American films